The list of Tulu films that are scheduled to be released in 2021.

Releases

January – June

Scheduled for July – Dec

See also
Tulu cinema
 Tulu Movie Actors
 Tulu Movie Actresses
Karnataka State Film Award for Best Regional film
RED FM Tulu Film Awards

References
News Related Tulu Film: 
 Mangaluru: Coastalwood and K Sooraj Shetty verses Mayur R Shetty
 Mangaluru: Appe Teacher

Tulu
Tulu-language films
Tulu